The 1975–76 season was Real Madrid Club de Fútbol's 73rd season in existence and the club's 44th consecutive season in the top flight of Spanish football.

Summary
The club clinched its 17th league title, finishing five points above runners-up CF Barcelona. Despite Cruijff, Neeskens and Co. having a better offensive line, Real Madrid managed to counterweight that with a brilliant defensive line that ultimately won them the trophy. During the summer, a back up line reinforcement Juan Sol arrived from Valencia. being crucial for the team during the campaign.

In the European Cup, the squad reached the semi-finals, losing the tie against back-to-back Champions Bayern Munich. The club was eliminated early in the Copa del Generalísimo round of 16 by underdogs CD Tenerife, despite playing the decisive match at the Santiago Bernabéu Stadium.

Squad

Transfers

Competitions

La Liga

Position by round

League table

Matches

Copa del Generalísimo

Fourth round

Round of 16

European Cup

First round

Round of 16

Quarter-finals

Semi-finals

Statistics

Players statistics

Notes

References

External links
 BDFútbol

Real Madrid CF seasons
Spanish football championship-winning seasons
Real Madrid